The Stureby murder occurred on the night of June 6–7, 2009, when 15-year-old Therese Johansson Rojo (born June 17, 1993) was murdered in Stureby, located outside of Stockholm, Sweden by two schoolmates. The two 16-year-olds, Tim Edgar Vrågård, later Tim Edgar Thörnberg (born 9 April 1993) and Tove Elisabet Lind, later Isabel Tove Elisabet Lind (born 12 May 1993) who eventually admitted to murdering Johansson Rojo, were arrested the following day.

The girl had managed to get the boy to carry out the murder by SMS text messages, telephone calls and chatroom contact during a period of time leading up to the murder.

Events of June 6, 2009
On the evening of June 6, the boy took Therese out into the woods during a party to celebrate that school was almost over and that prom was coming up. He hit her in the back with a tree branch and then strangled her to death. The boy and the girl who were charged with the murder were a couple and Therese Johansson Rojo had kissed the boy during a party in May 2009. The murderer was encouraged by his girlfriend through texting and chatroom contact to commit the murder to prove his love and get his girlfriend.

Sentencing 
Because of their young age, the two teenagers received twenty months imprisonment apiece in a special care home. The girl has appealed her sentence, delaying the implementation of her sentence until the appeal was considered by the court. 

The prosecution also appealed the sentencing decision, but in February of 2010 the appeals court rejected this and upheld the original sentencing. Both teenagers were scheduled to be released in summer of 2011. 

The sentences received a great deal of criticism from both the Swedish media and from the population at large, and calls have been made to change the law as it is applied to young offenders in Sweden, because the maximum sentence for a young offender is four years in custody. Sentencing guidelines were at the time under review, but had generally favored life imprisonment (possible only for offenders over 21 years) for premeditated murder, barring mitigating circumstances. While Sweden technically lacks the availability of release through parole, it is possible to have the sentence converted to a timed sentence, followed by release upon completion. The timed sentence can extend to any length, but is typically set to ensure release after about 14 to 16 years. For adults over 21, the effective penalty would thus likely have been seven to nine times the time served by the young couple.

Aftermath 
The newspaper Aftonbladet initiated a campaign called "Glöm inte Therese" on June 12, 2009, which gives money to the help organisation BRIS. Murder victim Riccardo Campogiani's parents also supported the campaign.
The Therese Johansson Rojo murder became the most noted murder in Sweden during 2009.

References

External links 
Sentence from Södertörns tingsrätt 2009-10-26
Timeline for the Stureby murder

Murder committed by minors
June 2009 crimes
2009 murders in Sweden